Stockley is a surname. Notable people with the surname include:

Charles C. Stockley (1819–1901), American politician
Cynthia Stockley (1873–1936), South African writer
Ena Stockley (1906–1989), New Zealand swimmer
Henry Stockley (1892–1982), English artist
Jayden Stockley (born 1993), English footballer
Mary Stockley, English actress
Miriam Stockley (born 1962), British singer
Sam Stockley (born 1977), English footballer
Tom Stockley (1936–2000), American writer
Tony Stockley (1940–1991), English cricketer
William Stockley (1859–1943), Irish politician